Kennaugh is a surname of Manx origin. Notable people with the surname include:

Peter Kennaugh, (born 1989), Manx racing cyclist
Hudson Kennaugh, (born 1981), South African motorcycle racer
Tim Kennaugh, (born 1991), Manx racing cyclist

Surnames of Manx origin